

Table

Matches

China vs West Germany

Sweden vs Tunisia

Tunisia vs West Germany

Sweden vs China

Tunisia vs China

Sweden vs West Germany

External links
 sports-reference

Groups
Group
1988 in Swedish football
1988 in Chinese football
1988 in Tunisian sport